Rodney Duncan McCray (born September 13, 1963) is an American former professional baseball player who is best known for crashing through an outfield fence attempting to make a catch. He played mostly in the minors, but also made it to the majors with the Chicago White Sox and New York Mets from 1990 to 1992.

Early life and career
Born in Detroit, McCray's family moved west while he was still a child. He enrolled at University High in Los Angeles, then attended West Los Angeles Junior College and Santa Monica Junior College. The speedy outfielder was drafted in the first round by the Chicago White Sox in 1982 and then by the Los Angeles Dodgers in 1983, but opted to stay in school. Finally, he signed with the San Diego Padres in 1984.

After four years in the Padres chain, the White Sox claimed him in the 1987 minor league draft. Never much of a hitter (his career minor league batting average was just .226), McCray proved effective by drawing walks (enough to pump his career on-base percentage up to .362) and stealing bases (as many as 91 in one season, with Charleston in 1986).

After making the majors with the White Sox in 1990, McCray was sent back down to the AAA Vancouver Canadians of the Pacific Coast League the following year. On May 27, 1991, at Civic Stadium (now Providence Park) in Portland, Oregon, McCray chased after a fly ball hit by Portland's Chip Hale. McCray initially made the catch, but immediately turned to run right through a plywood fence in right field, just to the right of the  marker, which caused him to drop the ball. The play was shown repeatedly on newscasts across the country; a video clip of the play is now part of a blooper reel looped at the Baseball Hall of Fame.

McCray made it back up to the White Sox later that year, but was used almost exclusively as a pinch runner and backup outfielder.

After signing with the New York Mets in 1992, McCray was again relegated to pinch running until May 8 against the Dodgers in Shea Stadium, when he pinch-ran for Eddie Murray, stayed in the game as the right fielder and then batted in the ninth with two men on and the score tied at 3-3. Off reliever Tim Crews, McCray delivered a game-winning single in what was to be his only major league at-bat of 1992 (and the final one of his career). After appearing in two more games as a pinch runner, the Mets released McCray on June 8; after batting .242 in 61 games for the independent Thunder Bay Whiskey Jacks of the Northern League in 1993, he retired as a player.

McCray played in 67 major league games but logged just fourteen at-bats (with three hits), while stealing nine bases in ten attempts.

Later life
Rodney later served as a coach in the minor-leagues for the Lethbridge Mounties in 1994 and Lansing Lugnuts in 1998, and later a minor league base running and outfield instructor in the Los Angeles Dodgers organization.

On August 12, 2006, McCray was honored in Portland with the "Rodney McCray Bobblehead Night", honoring his memorable crash through the wall. McCray threw out the first pitch, and right-center field of PGE Park was renamed "McCray Alley" in his honor. "I just wish I had run through something like a Coca-Cola sign so I could have gotten endorsements," McCray said. "Instead, I ran through a local sign, `Flav-R-Pac meats.'" 
He is currently an assistant coach for Calvin Meadlock for the C2 teams in Houston, Texas.

ESPN, in its series Who's Number 1?, ranked the fence incident as the seventh-favourite sports blooper of all time. The Best Damn Sports Show Period ranked the incident number one in their countdown of the Top 50 Devastating Hits in sports history.

On June 4, 2019, McCray's son Grant was drafted by the San Francisco Giants in the third round of the 2019 MLB Rule 4 Draft.

Notes

External links

Video of McCray running through wall

1963 births
Living people
African-American baseball players
American expatriate baseball players in Canada
American expatriate baseball players in Mexico
Baseball players from Detroit
Birmingham Barons players
Charleston Rainbows players
Chicago White Sox players
Major League Baseball outfielders
New York Mets players
Reno Padres players
Santa Monica Corsairs baseball players
Sarasota White Sox players
South Bend White Sox players
Spokane Indians players
Baseball players from Los Angeles
Sultanes de Monterrey players
Thunder Bay Whiskey Jacks players
Tidewater Tides players
Vancouver Canadians players
West Los Angeles Wildcats baseball players
21st-century African-American people
20th-century African-American sportspeople
University High School (Los Angeles) alumni